The quantum jump method, also known as the Monte Carlo wave function (MCWF) is a technique in computational physics used for simulating open quantum systems and quantum dissipation. The quantum jump method was developed by Dalibard, Castin and Mølmer at a similar time to the similar method known as Quantum Trajectory Theory developed by Carmichael. Other contemporaneous works on wave-function-based Monte Carlo approaches to open quantum systems include those of Dum, Zoller and Ritsch and Hegerfeldt and Wilser.

Method 

The quantum jump method is an approach which is much like the master-equation treatment except that it operates on the wave function rather than using a density matrix approach. The main component of this method is evolving the system's wave function in time with a pseudo-Hamiltonian; where at each time step, a quantum jump (discontinuous change) may take place with some probability. The calculated system state as a function of time is known as a quantum trajectory, and the desired density matrix as a function of time may be calculated by averaging over many simulated trajectories. For a Hilbert space of dimension N, the number of wave function components is equal to N while the number of density matrix components is equal to N2. Consequently, for certain problems the quantum jump method offers a performance advantage over direct master-equation approaches.

References

Further reading 
 A recent review is

External links 
 mcsolve Quantum jump (Monte Carlo) solver from QuTiP for Python.
 QuantumOptics.jl the quantum optics toolbox in Julia.
 Quantum Optics Toolbox for Matlab

Quantum mechanics
Computational physics
Monte Carlo methods